Yana Ivanovna Alekseevna (born 30 October 1987) is a Ukrainian-born Azerbaijani boxer. She competed in the women's lightweight event at the 2016 Summer Olympics.

References

External links
 

1987 births
Living people
Ukrainian women boxers
Azerbaijani women boxers
Olympic boxers of Azerbaijan
Boxers at the 2016 Summer Olympics
Place of birth missing (living people)
Boxers at the 2015 European Games
European Games medalists in boxing
European Games bronze medalists for Azerbaijan
AIBA Women's World Boxing Championships medalists
Lightweight boxers
Ukrainian emigrants to Azerbaijan
Naturalized citizens of Azerbaijan